The Engine Collection (Dansk Motor- og Maskinsamling) by the town Grenå on the peninsula Djursland in Denmark, at the entrance to The Baltic Sea holds Northern Europe's largest collection of stationary engines, with over 450 engines on exhibit, most of them restored and functioning.

The Collection has got a machine shop for dismantling and rebuilding engines, where new parts are made, when necessary. The Collection also exhibits some historical machinery, such as a band saw based sawmill driven by a Bukh engine via an elaborate belt drive, connecting the indoor engine with the outdoor sawmill.

Organization

The engine Collection is a foundation based on volunteers with many special skills, such as mechanical specialists in the field of engine restoration. A task that may include milling of new cylinders, pistons and glow heads with the contours of the old rusted parts as models, as well as manufacture of all sorts of engine parts that are missing or to or damaged or rusted for repair.

The collection has a club of working supporters. The members may have a background from metal-industry or engines, or have other skills and resources needed to undertake the maintenance and expansion of a mechanical restoration institution and a museum.

The Collections finances depend on goodwill from foundations and private sponsors, such as industries that work in related fields, and are interested in preserving the history of technology, and are willing to make equipment and manpower available. In one case this involved ship transport with a tug boat, cranes and flatbed trailer, when 3 large B&W engines from the deserted military island Flakfortet in Øresund, across the Kattegat had to be moved to Grenaa on Djursland for restoration. The flywheel alone for these engines weighs 1.5 tons.

Exhibition

The engines are exhibited in several buildings, being expanded as the collection grows.

The primary focus at The Engine Collection is stationary internal combustion engines, from the earliest atmospheric Otto & Langen engine from 1868 up to engines from 1960 - 1970. The collection has a special interest in Danish engines, but has also restored, and exhibits, many other engines. Manufacturers often copied each other's concepts and improvements in disregard of national borders and brands.

It can be a logistic challenge to get large engines weighing several tons moved from old factory buildings and plants to the Collection. An example of this is three rusted and vandalized B&W DM 220 diesel engines from 1914, that were transferred from the electricity works at the Flak Fort (Flakfortet) bunkers on an uninhabited island in Øresund by Sealand in 2002.

The engines in the Collection are mostly run in connection with arrangements and events. They are also started up for prebooked groups.

The oldest engine in the collection is from 1868 and belongs to the very early days of the internal combustion engine. It is an Otto and Langen, "Atmospheric Engine" based on a vertical cannon principle, where a piston is shot up fired by town gas in a freewheeling stroke, without pulling. After the explosion, when the piston goes down, the vacuum from contraction of the exhaust gas, plus gravity, moves the piston down, driving the engine. The design has no camshaft. An array of handmade cogged wheels transfer the piston motion to rotation. The engine speed is regulated via opening and closing of the exhaust valve. The Otto and Langen engine is on loan from The Danish Technical Museum, but is placed at The Engine Collection, where it was restored. The engine is listed as one of the world's oldest internal combustion engines, according to the Engine Collection. The name, Otto, is also seen in the, Otto-Motor, synonymous of the conventional, 4-stroke engine, which was invented by Niklaus August Otto (1832 - 1891) a little less than a decade after the same Otto co-invented the atmospheric engine. The Otto-engine is a technological pillar stone of modern society. For example, the 4-stroke Otto-Engine is the working principle behind the car engine.

Power source development

After the heyday of the steam engines, and before electrification lead to electric motors being the main power source for machines, the stationary combustion engine was an important power source in industry and farming. The stationary internal combustion engine outcompeted the steam engine, and was itself outcompeted by electric motors. The electric motor was more compact and demanded less maintenance. In Denmark the transfer to electric motors mainly took place between 1920 - 1950.

There is a large representation of different makes of 2 - 10 Hp stationary engines at The Machine Collection. The demand for these smaller engines was driven by an, at the time, important farming sector in Denmark, that not only supplied the home market but developed a significant export, not least bacon and butter to England. On farms the stationary engine was typically placed in a separate machine house, where the engine was started at least twice a day, powering a compressor for milking equipment. These below 10 Hp engines on farms were also used to power other machinery such as threshers and grinding mills.

One reasons for the focus on Danish engines at The Engine Collection is that there were more than 200 stationary engine manufacturers in Denmark, often with their own foundry, in the golden ages of Danish industrialisation, 1890 - 1930. A similar multitude of manufacturers where found in some other countries.
The emphasis on Danish engines at The Engine Collection has also to do with that the largest Danish manufacturer, B&W, held nearly 50 pct. of the world market for ship diesel engines in the late twenties, making it one of the technology leaders at that time. These often large B&W-engines were also used as stationary engines at electricity plants to power generators, and as power sources for factories, starting with elaborate belt driven distribution of power to machines on the factory, ending with driving a generator, supplying the machines with power through electrical cables.

Ongoing projects
Under "Ongoing projects" at the homepage (in Danish, but with pictures) of the Machine Collection, one can follow current restoration projects such as an, IF Fleetstar 2050 A, lorry from 1971 with a V-8 engine and an ash-wood inner frame cabin.

A recently (2014) completed restoration project is a Danish, Eickhoff, engine from 1887. Some of the engines in The Collection are one af a kind, such as a Rudolf Kramper engine from 1927, which may be the only one left in the World.

References

External links
 Official website

Norddjurs Municipality
Tourist attractions in Denmark
Tourist attractions in the Central Denmark Region